941 Murray (prov. designation:  or ) is a background asteroid, approximately  in diameter, located in the central region of the asteroid belt. It was discovered by Austrian astronomer Johann Palisa at the Vienna Observatory on 10 October 1920. The X-type asteroid has a short rotation period of 3.4 hours. It was named after British professor Gilbert Murray (1866–1957).

Orbit and classification 

Murray is a non-family asteroid of the main belt's background population when applying the hierarchical clustering method to its proper orbital elements. It orbits the Sun in the central asteroid belt at a distance of 2.2–3.3 AU once every 4 years and 8 months (1,695 days; semi-major axis of 2.78 AU). Its orbit has an eccentricity of 0.20 and an inclination of 7° with respect to the ecliptic. The body's observation arc begins at Vienna Observatory on 11 October 1920, the night after its official discovery observation.

Naming 

This minor planet was named after Gilbert Murray (1866–1957), British classical scholar and diplomat who helped post-war Austria in 1920 through the League of Nations. The  was mentioned in The Names of the Minor Planets by Paul Herget in 1955.

Physical characteristics 

In the Tholen classification, Murray is a carbonaceous C-type asteroid (CX), somewhat similar to that of an X-type, while in the Bus-Binzel SMASS classification, it is an X-type asteroid.

Rotation period 

In December 2018, a rotational lightcurve of Murray was obtained from photometric observations by the Spanish astronomer group OBAS. Lightcurve analysis gave a notably short rotation period of  hours with a brightness amplitude of  magnitude.

Diameter and albedo 

The Collaborative Asteroid Lightcurve Link assumes a standard albedo for a carbonaceous asteroid of 0.057 and calculates a diameter of 27.26 kilometers based on an absolute magnitude of 11.55.

References

External links 
 Lightcurve Database Query (LCDB), at www.minorplanet.info
 Dictionary of Minor Planet Names, Google books
 Discovery Circumstances: Numbered Minor Planets (1)-(5000) – Minor Planet Center
 
 

000941
Discoveries by Johann Palisa
Named minor planets
000941
000941
19201010